Primitive Radio Gods is an American alternative rock band from Southern California. Current members consist of frontman Chris O'Connor, who performs vocals and bass; percussionist Tim Lauterio; and Luke McAuliffe, who contributes various additional instrumentation (guitars, violins, piano) as well as much of the art that has appeared on the band's albums and website. Former member Jeff Sparks wrote, sang, and played bass before leaving the band to pursue other music projects in 2001.

The band is best known for their 1996 hit "Standing Outside a Broken Phone Booth with Money in My Hand", which peaked No. 1 on the Billboard Alternative Songs chart.

History

Early years (1991–1994)
The history of the Primitive Radio Gods begins with The I-Rails. Formed in the late 1980s, The I-Rails were an independent alternative rock band based in Oxnard, California. Consisting of three members, bassist/singer Chris O'Connor, guitarist Jeff Sparks (a childhood friend of O'Connor), and drummer Tim Lauterio, The I-Rails released a total of four albums, none of which received much public attention. After the fourth album, Panharmonium, was released in 1990 and similarly ignored, the band decided to split. While Sparks and Lauterio went on to pursue other potential careers, O'Connor continued to work with material originally intended for a fifth I-Rails album. Inspired by bands such as Public Enemy, O'Connor recorded additional material and ultimately mixed a total of ten tracks. After mastering, O'Connor released the demo to public music stations under the (misspelled) moniker "Primative Radio Gods", a song on the I-Rails album Nine Songs from Nowhere. Like his former band's works, O'Connor's Rocket, as the album came to be called, was widely disregarded by both radio and the general public. Defeated, O'Connor retired from the music business.

Mainstream success (1994–1996)
While housecleaning in 1994, O'Connor rediscovered the box of demo tapes he had packed away years prior. In a final act of desperation, he mailed copies of the tape to any major record label he could think of. Weeks later, he received a call from an executive named Jonathan Daniel from the New York City offices of Fiction Records. One unique song in particular had caught Daniel's attention: "Standing Outside a Broken Phone Booth with Money in My Hand", a piano-driven ballad over a hip-hop backbeat, which heavily sampled B. B. King's "How Blue Can You Get?". Daniel immediately signed O'Connor to a publishing deal, and took him to Columbia Records for a recording deal. "Phone Booth" first appeared on the soundtrack to the black comedy film The Cable Guy in May 1996, and a slightly remastered Rocket was released the following month. "Phone Booth" was released to radio as the Primitive Radio Gods' first single, and was remarkably successful in the U.S. market. Due to the single's success, Rocket was certified gold.

Fall from the public eye (1997–2001)
Due to the success of Rocket, O'Connor reunited with his former bandmates Sparks and Lauterio and recruited guitarist Luke McAuliffe to form a complete band, and the foursome toured North America throughout the summer of 1996. Later in the year, the band attempted to release a second single, "Motherfucker", but lack of promotion resulted in very little radio airplay, far from the runaway success that "Phone Booth" had become. Early in 1997, they began writing and recording their first material as a full band. Shortly after, Columbia dropped the band without warning or apparent reason. However, Jonathan Daniel, the former Columbia executive who had originally signed them (and a self-proclaimed fan of the band), arranged a deal with Hi-Fi/Sire Records for the band's next album, Mellotron On!. In [1999], mere weeks before the album was set to be released, Sire Records and the U.S. division of London Records underwent a merger, causing the release of Mellotron On! to be postponed. London-Sire did not want to drop the band, but were having issues negotiating the release of the album. As the band waited for the issue to resolve itself, its members took on day jobs: O'Connor, who had lived off the money he made from Rocket as long as possible, was forced to get a job as a flower delivery man. Eventually, London-Sire dropped the band, but Jonathan Daniel was there to pick them up again. He signed them to a personal project of his, Boulder, Colorado-based indie label What Are Records?. The second album was finally released in late 2000, retitled White Hot Peach  and consisting of a slightly different track listing than Mellotron On!. White Hot Peach was made available in certain indie record stores and over a number of online music sharing services such as eMusic and Napster.

Independent era (2001–present)
After the release of White Hot Peach, the band released a few additional works through What Are Records?, including an extended version of the LP and the Fading Out EP. In addition, a pair of ten-track albums were released on eMusic.com, containing unreleased material and songs recorded for Mellotron On! that did not appear on White Hot Peach. By late 2001, Jeff Sparks had left the band to pursue other musical ventures, while the remaining members had begun work on a third album. They were no longer attached to What Are Records?, instead opting to release future material through their new website. The site originally consisted of a series of cryptic images, some of which were later revealed to be lyrics from the forthcoming album. The website largely remained this way until March 2003, when they announced the release of their new album, Still Electric. The band began selling promotional copies of the original intended release of Mellotron On! at around the same time; a DVD version of Still Electric featuring home-made music videos for all eleven songs was released in September; and a second edition of Still Electric (with different cover art and missing the track "Normalizer") was released in early 2004. The site remained mostly quiet until August 2005, when the band created a MySpace account, featuring a brand new song from a forthcoming album. The band's fourth album, Sweet Venus, was released on May 4, 2006, exclusively as an mp3 download. In 2010, the band released a fifth album Out Alive. The band have since offered most of their back catalog (excluding Rocket and White Hot Peach) through their online MP3 store, and have uploaded the videos from the Still Electric DVD to YouTube. Manmade Sun, the band's sixth album, was released on December 26, 2016.

Discography

As The I-Rails

Studio albums
Valentino Says (1987)
Unfocused (1988)
Nine Songs from Nowhere (1989)
Panharmonium (1990)

Singles
"Same Old Me / Everyone's in Love" (1988)

As Primitive Radio Gods

Studio albums
Rocket (1996)- #36 US
White Hot Peach (2000)
Still Electric (2003)
Sweet Venus (2006)
Out Alive (2010)
Manmade Sun (2016)
Untitled Final LP (2020)

EPs
Fading Out (2001)

Compilation albums
Mellotron On! (1999/2003)
Umpteen Spooks (2006)
Motor of Joy (2006)

DVD releases
Still Electric: Interactive Video Album (DVD, 2003)

Singles

References

External links
Primitive Radio Gods Official website
Luke McAuliffe's Archive of Art, Music and Motorcycles
Tomatrax interview with the Primitive Radio Gods

Alternative rock groups from California
Musical groups established in 1991
American musical trios
Columbia Records artists
Sire Records artists
London Records artists
1991 establishments in California
Santa Barbara, California
Musical quartets